Schicker Mound is a Native American archaeological site located near Tallulah, Louisiana, United States. It is located very close to suburban houses.

Description
Site surveys have not produced and items or artifacts which would help to definitively date it to a specific time period. The mound had a substantial amount of fill removed from it to accommodate a cellar and house foundation in 1926.

References

Archaeological sites of the Coles Creek culture
Mounds in Louisiana
Geography of Madison Parish, Louisiana